Gerrit van Spaan (1654–1711) was an 18th-century writer from the Northern Netherlands.

Van Spaan was born and died in Rotterdam. In 1670 he volunteered for a sea voyage to punish Algerian pirates, which failed, but brought him inspiration for his later writing career.

Works
Gelukzoeker over zee of Afrikaansche wegwijzer, 1691
 Aziaansche wegwijzer, 1695
 "A History of Rotterdam and some surrounding villages", 1698.
 Schermschool der huislieden, 1702
 Het koddig en vermakelijk leven van Louwtje van Zevenhuizen, 1704

References

author page in the DBNL

1654 births
1711 deaths
Writers from Rotterdam
18th-century Dutch historians
17th-century Dutch historians